WKSF (99.9 FM "Kiss Country") is a country music station licensed to serve Old Fort, North Carolina. The iHeartMedia, Inc. station broadcasts from a tower on Mount Pisgah, southwest of Asheville with an ERP of 53,000 watts. The tower is shared with former sister station WLOS (ABC).

History
This station originally launched by Skyway Broadcasting Corporation in 1947 as WLOS-FM, and simulcasted its AM sister station (today's WKJV) before adopting an individual format of beautiful music by the mid-1960s.  Skyway sold WLOS-AM-FM and its sister TV outlet to Wometco Enterprises in 1958.  The station dropped the -FM suffix from its call sign after the sale of the AM station in 1969, remained a Wometco property until 1984.  During the mid-1980s, the station was briefly known as WRLX. It was 99.9 KISS-FM playing Top 40-Rock in the mid eighties to early 90s. KISS-FM was most known for its big top-40 days, with many tempo DJs, including Brian Maloney, John Stevens, Dawn Creasman, Chuck Finley, Brother Bill, GT, Radar and Pat Garrett. It was quite common for "Kiss" to pull huge ratings at that time.  With little competition in the market, an audience share of 30 percent was very common. 

When the station was acquired by Osborn Communications in 1993, the station flipped format from Top 40 to Country April 2, 1994. The Mid-Day talent and Music Director at the time, Nikki Thomas, was a holdover from the Top 40 station and was instrumental in the flip to country. Thomas and then Overnight host Eddie Foxx were the only two staffers that remained after the flip. Scott McKay, Bill Kachur, Todd-Zilla and JJ Cook left the station. The station stunted with a non-stop 30-hour broadcast with Thomas that culminated at a Vince Gill concert at the Asheville Civic Center. Thomas took the stage with WWNC's Frank Byrd and together they introduced the New KISS Country to the sold out crowd. Bruce Buchanan was named PD and morning man during the first rating period which started the day of the format change. In spite of no promotion monies the ARB debut was 31.6 18-34, and 17.9 12+.

The initial plan was to just run music with sweeps between the songs until a full staff could be pulled together, but after the incredible response at the Vince Gill concert, Osborn rethought their plan and had Thomas to hit the air the following Monday in Afternoon Drive. Nikki Thomas was moved to mornings, after Buchanan was terminated a few hours before the ARB numbers were released, as the lead host on the show in 1994 with WTQR and WQYK's, Dale Mitchell and Steve Lewis who came from Denver's KYGO and upon his return, was paired with Chuck Finley.

In the late 90s, the program director was Glenn Trent and the morning show featured Chuck Finley and Nikki Thomas. WKSF had weekend talent like Mitch Ensley, Brother Bill, and South Florida Radio Veteran George Sheldon.

Although the station's numbers don't rate quite as high as they did back then with little competition in the market, the KISS Country format has proven to be very successful. The station is consistently number one in both average and cume numbers.

In 2004, when WQNQ began airing separate programming from WQNS, the station moved its city of license from Old Fort, which required another station moving its city of license to Old Fort. WKSF, always licensed to Asheville before that, made this move.

Coverage
WKSF's transmitter is sited atop Mt. Pisgah (at an elevation of over 5,700 ft. above sea level), giving it a wide coverage area across Western North Carolina and beyond. With the height of the tower and the mountain combined, the transmitter actually sits at over 6,000 ft. in elevation, making it the radio station with one of the highest transmitters east of the Mississippi River behind WMIT, WNCW on Clingman's Peak near Mount Mitchell, NC and WHOM on Mt Washington, NH.  Kiss Country actually shares a tower with WLOS-TV, which is dubbed as having the highest TV transmitter east of the Mississippi. In addition to Western North Carolina, the station's signal makes it into parts of South Carolina, Georgia, Tennessee, Virginia and even parts of southeast Kentucky.

The station can be heard well west of Knoxville, fading out near Crossville, Tennessee and prior to 2005 with the inception of WCMC-FM in Raleigh, could be heard at higher elevations in central North Carolina as far east as Chatham County and Orange County.

Programming
Kiss Country plays a mix of modern and older country music, with more emphasis on current artists. 99.9 Kiss Country is the 2009 CMA Small Market Station of the Year.  Staff include Eddie Foxx and Amanda Foxx of the "Eddie Foxx Show".

Hurricane Ivan
During the passage of the remnants of Hurricane Ivan through western North Carolina in 2004, the station preempted its music broadcasting, so that residents throughout western North Carolina could call in storm and damage reports. The station also relayed flood information, updated road closings and power outage reports throughout the storm.

97.7 The Brew
On July 22, 2014, 97.7 the Brew, an adult hits station, made its debut on the WKSF HD-2 channel. According to Clear Channel Asheville operations director Jeff Davis, the name refers to Asheville's craft beer industry, and music will include the decades the 1970s to the 2000s "and maybe even a little 60s", with formats ranging from Top 40 to hot adult contemporary to classic and mainstream rock and even country music. Artists include U2, Katy Perry, Boston, Bon Jovi, Lady Antebellum, Michael Jackson and Madonna. The station can also be heard on iHeartRadio and W249AR at 97.7 FM.

101.1 The Revolution
On June 11, 2018, 101.1 The Revolution, a progressive talk format made its debut on the WKSF HD-3 channel, when that format moved from WPEK 880 AM Fairview, which switched to ESPN sports.

Alt 101.1
On December 20, 2018, WKSF-HD3 changed their format from progressive talk to alternative rock, branded as "Alt 101.1".

References

External links
Official website

KSF
Wometco Enterprises
IHeartMedia radio stations